Daga River may refer to

Daga River, an alternative spelling of Daya River, India
Dagā River, Burma
Daga River (South Sudan)